Lukáš Blohon is a Czech Magic: The Gathering player. He was the winner of Pro Tour Eldrich Moon in 2016. He also had a quarterfinals appearance at Pro Tour Dark Ascension in 2012.

Achievements

References 

Living people
Czech Magic: The Gathering players
Sportspeople from Prague
Year of birth missing (living people)